Viira may refer to several places in Estonia:

Viira, Põlva County, village in Veriora Parish, Põlva County
Viira, Lääne-Saare Parish, village in Lääne-Saare Parish, Saare County
Viira, Leisi Parish, village in Leisi Parish, Saare County
Viira, Muhu Parish, village in Muhu Parish, Saare County
Viira, Tartu County, village in Luunja Parish, Tartu County